Edwin Holt Hughes (7 December 1866 – 12 February 1950) was an American bishop of the Methodist Episcopal Church, elected in 1908.

Birth and family
Edwin was born in Moundsville, West Virginia, the son of the Rev. Thomas B. and Louisa (Holt) Hughes.  He married Isabel Ebbert on 8 June 1892.  She predeceased him.  They had six children:  Isabel, Holt, Ebbert, Caroline, Anna Louise, and Francis.

Education
He studied at West Virginia University beginning in 1887, graduating from Ohio Wesleyan University in 1889 (A.B. degree) and 1892 (A.M. degree).  He then attended Boston University School of Theology, 1889-92.

Honorary degrees
Bishop Holt was honored with such degrees by Ohio Wesleyan, Wesleyan University, Norwich University, Boston University, the University of Rochester, Florida Southern College, Dickinson College, the University of Southern California, and DePauw University.

Ministry
Rev. Hughes began preaching in 1886.  He was pastor at Newton Centre, Massachusetts (1892–96), and at Malden, Massachusetts (1896–1903).

He then became the president of DePauw University, Greencastle, Indiana, in 1903.  As president he worked on promoting student discipline and reducing the university's financial deficits.  By the time Hughes left office, the university's endowment had more than doubled, from $231,000 to $530,000.  His term as president ended in 1909 shortly after assuming the work of a bishop.

Rev. Hughes was elected president of the State Teachers' Association of Indiana for the year 1904.

Episcopal ministry

Bishop Hughes traveled widely throughout the Church.  In addition, he served as a trustee of Boston University, American University, Dickinson College, Ohio Wesleyan, Northwestern University, and DePauw.  He was the president of the Religious Committee of the Panama Pacific Exposition (1910–11).  Hughes served as acting chancellor of American University in 1923, where the dormitory building Hughes Hall is now named in his honor.  He also served as a member of the Muhlenberg Bicentennial Commission in 1942.

He was a fraternal delegate to Irish and English Methodism in 1930, representing American Methodism.  He was the senior chairman of the Methodist Unification Commission (1938–40), that ultimately accomplished the reunion of the three major Methodist bodies in the U.S. in 1939.

In retirement Bishop Hughes lived in Chevy Chase, Maryland.  He was taken ill for the final time while on a speaking engagement in Muncie, Indiana.  He died 12 February 1950 of viral pneumonia after two weeks in a hospital in Washington, D.C.

Literary work
 Letters on Evangelism (New York, 1906)
 Thanksgiving Sermons (1909)
 The Teaching of Citizenship (1909)
 A Boy's Religion (1914)
 The Bible and Life (1914)
He edited:
 Hauréau, J. B., Les Œuvres de Hugues de Saint Victor (Paris 1886)
 Harnack, Dogma (vol. VI)

See also
List of bishops of the United Methodist Church

References

Sources
 Howell, Clinton T., Prominent Personalities in American Methodism, Birmingham, Alabama:  The Lowry Press, 1945.

External links
Presidents of DePauw University
DePauw University archives: Edwin Holt Hughes
 
 

1866 births
1950 deaths
People from Moundsville, West Virginia
Bishops of the Methodist Episcopal Church
West Virginia University alumni
Ohio Wesleyan University alumni
Boston University School of Theology alumni
Presidents of DePauw University
Norwich University alumni